Deh Yusefan may refer to:

Deh Yusefan-e Olya
Deh Yusefan-e Sofla